The Sri Lanka women's cricket team is scheduled to tour England in September 2023 to play three Women's One Day Internationals (WODIs) and three Women's Twenty20 Internationals (WT20Is). In September 2022, the England and Wales Cricket Board announced the fixtures of the series, along with the 2023 Men's and Women's Ashes.

WT20I series

1st WT20I

2nd WT20I

3rd WT20I

WODI series

1st WODI

2nd WODI

3rd WODI

References

External links
 Series home at ESPN Cricinfo

Women's cricket tours of England
2023 in Sri Lankan cricket
2023 in English cricket
International cricket competitions in 2023
England 2023
cricket
2023 in women's cricket